The secretive dwarf squirrel (Prosciurillus abstrusus) is a species of rodent in the family Sciuridae. It is endemic to Sulawesi, Indonesia, where it is found on the Mengkoka Mountains in southeastern Sulawesi. Its natural habitat is montane forest. It is threatened by habitat loss.

References

Thorington, R. W. Jr. and R. S. Hoffman. 2005. Family Sciuridae. pp. 754–818 in Mammal Species of the World a Taxonomic and Geographic Reference. D. E. Wilson and D. M. Reeder eds. Johns Hopkins University Press, Baltimore.

Prosciurillus
Rodents of Sulawesi
Endemic fauna of Indonesia
Mammals described in 1958
Taxonomy articles created by Polbot